Aslan Aliyevich Dzharimov is a Russian politician who served as the President of the Adyghe Republic from 1992 to 2002.

Education
He graduated from the Agronomy Faculty of the Kuban State Agrarian University in 1964, post-graduate degree in agricultural economics in 1968, ANI of the Central Committee in 1985, Candidate of Agricultural Sciences, Doctor of Economics.

Political activity 
Dzharimov is the only leader in the history of Adygea to occupy all three top party and government positions, both under the party-Soviet form of organization of power, and in the new democratic Russia, successively holding the posts of First Secretary of the Adygea Regional Committee of the CPSU, then Chairman of the Council of People's Deputies of the Adygea Autonomous Region and President of the Republic of Adygea.

Member of the CPSU from 1956 until its ban in August 1991.

The USSR 
From 1968 to 1970, Dzharimov was the head of the planning and economic department of the Adyghe Regional Department of Agriculture.

From 1970 to 1973 he was Deputy Head of the Department of Agriculture of the Adyghe Regional Committee of the CPSU.

From 1973 to 1975 he was Director of the Adyge Regional State Agricultural Experimental Station.

From 1975 to 1980 he was Head of the Department of Agriculture and Food Industry of the Adyghe Regional Committee of the CPSU.

From 1980 to 1984 he was Secretary of the Adyghe Regional Committee of the CPSU (supervised issues of the agro-industrial complex).

From 1984 to 1987 he was Head of the Department of Agriculture and Food Industry of the Krasnodar Regional Committee of the CPSU.

From 1987 to 1989 he was Secretary of the Krasnodar Regional Committee of the CPSU.

From 1989 to 1991 he was First Secretary of the Adyghe Regional Committee of the CPSU.

From 1990 to 1992 he was Chairman of the Adyghe Regional Council of People's Deputies.

He was elected a people's deputy of the USSR for the national-territorial district N703 (Adygea), was a member of the Deputy group of communists. In 1990 he was a delegate to the Constituent Congress of the Communist Party of the RSFSR and the XXVIII Congress of the CPSU. At the Second Congress of People's Deputies of the USSR in December 1989, he opposed the inclusion on the agenda of the question of the abolition of Article 6 of the Constitution of the USSR.

On October 5, 1990, at a session of the regional Council of People's Deputies, the Autonomous Soviet Socialist Republic (ASSR) of Adygea was proclaimed as part of the RSFSR.

Family
He is married and has two daughters.

He is a Master in Sambo. He gained a champion of the Russian Federation of Sambo in 2000, and he became the world champion in Sambo among veterans in the weight category of over 100 kilograms.

References

Circassian people of Russia
1939 births
Living people
Heads of the Republic of Adygea
Russian Sunni Muslims
People from Koshekhablsky District